The 2022 Turkish Women's Cup was the sixth edition of the Turkish Women's Cup, an invitational women's football tournament held annually in Turkey. It took place from 16 to 22 February 2022.

Teams
Six teams were participating.

Squads

Standings

Results
All times are local (UTC+3)

Goalscorers

References

Turkish Women's Cup
Turkish Women's Cup
Turkish Women's Cup
Turkish Women's Cup
Turkish